Peripsocus madidus is a species of stout barklouse in the family Peripsocidae occurring in Central America and North America.

References

Peripsocidae
Articles created by Qbugbot
Insects described in 1861